Grace Ndiritu (born June, 1982) is a British-Kenyan visual artist. In 2009, her art was on display at the Metropolitan Museum of Art collection in New York. This gained her a place in Phaidon's The 21st Century Art Book published in 2014 and Time magazine in 2020. She is a member of BAFTA and also the winner of The Jarman Film Award 2022  in association with Film London.

Education

Ndiritu studied textile art at Winchester School of Art, UK and De Ateliers, Amsterdam. Her teachers included Marlene Dumas (painter), Steve McQueen (film director), Tacita Dean (artist) and Stan Douglas (artist). Afterwards she attended a UK studio residency, Delfina Foundation, London (2004-2006).

Personal life

In 2012, Ndiritu made the decision to only spend time in the city when necessary, and to otherwise live in Rural, alternative and often spiritual communities, while expanding her research into nomadic lifestyles and training in esoteric studies such as shamanism, which she began over 16 years ago. In her research she has visited Thai and Tibetan Buddhist monasteries, permaculture communities in New Zealand, forest tree dwellers in Argentina, neo-tribal festivals including the Burning Man in Nevada, a Hare Krishna ashram and the Findhorn New Age community in Scotland. 

A result of this research was her ambitious post-internet living research/live art project, The Ark: Center For Interdisciplinary Experimentation, that took place from 1 to 10 July 2017. Her ideas between the rural and urban have also been documented in Whitechapel Gallery's publication: Documents of Contemporary Art: The Rural (2019) MIT Press.

Work

In 2012, Ndiritu began creating a new body of works under the title Healing The Museum. It came out of a need to re-introduce non-rational methodologies such as shamanism to re-activate the "sacredness" of art spaces. Ndiritu believes that most modern art institutions are out of sync with their audiences' everyday experiences and the widespread socio-economical and political changes that have taken place globally in the recent decades, have further eroded the relationship between museums and their audiences and she believes museums are dying. Ndiritu sees shamanism as a way to re-activate the dying art space as a space for sharing, participation and ethics. From prehistoric to modern times the shaman was not only the group healer and facilitator of peace but also the creative; the artist. 

In 2019 Ndiritu led a group of museum directors, academics, activists and artists, in a reading group with meditation at the controversial AfricaMuseum in Tervuren, Belgium, as part of conference Everything Passes Except the Past organized by Goethe Institut, on the restitution of objects and human remains from Europe back to Congo.

Ndiritu declared that 2020 was The Year of Black Healing. In honor of this, she led a year long programme of exhibitions, performances and talks in collaboration with institutions across the world, which was featured on The Sunday Times radio show with Mariella Frostrup and Elephant magazine.

Performance

Since 2013 Ndiritu has been doing shamanic performances as part of her visual art practice, as a result of her training in esoteric studies such as shamanism, which she began over 16 years ago. In 2017 she was invited to give a talk on her work at Fondation Ricard in Paris, alongside other renown speakers such as Carolyn Christov-Bakargiev - director of Documenta 13 art exhibition and Fabrice Hergott - director of Musée d'Art Moderne de la ville de Paris 

She has also written essays about museums and exhibition making Healing The Museum (2016), Ways of Seeing: A New Museum Story for Planet Earth (2017) and Institutional Racism & Spiritual Practice in the art world (2019). Her most ambitious shamanic performance to date A Meal For My Ancestors: Healing The Museum, included staff members of the U.N., NATO and EU parliament, activists, and refugees at Thalielab, Brussels (2018). A briefing paper on climate change and refugees directly inspired by the performance, written by one of the participants, has now been published by the EU Parliament Research Services (May 2018). To date Ndiritu's performances have taken place at Fundacion Tapies, Barcelona (2017), Laboratoires d'Aubervilliers, Paris (2016), Glasgow School of Art (2015), Galveston Artist Residency Garden, Texas (2015), Museum of Modern Art, Warsaw (2014), Musee Chasse & Nature, Paris (2013), Centre Pompidou, Paris (2013).

Film/video

Her archive of over forty "hand-crafted" videos are largely held in the archive of LUX - British Artists Film/Video archive. Notably her video The Nightingale has been shown during the 51st Venice Biennale (2005) and is now housed the Metropolitan Museum of Art, New York. 
Furthermore, her video Still Life White Textiles (2007) has been used as a reference in art appreciation and art history classes throughout colleges and universities since 2010.

Photography

Since 2010, Ndiritu has been creating an encyclopaedic archive of images, entitled A Quest For Meaning (AQFM) It is a universal narrative, a creation story from the beginning of time. Told through photography it tells "stories" between similarly disparate objects and events from the Big Bang until now, by conjuring up and making new connections between them. Abstract photography allows Ndiritu to explore the formalism of the still life genre in such a way that what appears in the microcosm of the photograph is a reflection of what occurs in the macrocosm of the universe. Closely connected to her interests in the moving image, the various themes in AQFM perpetually expand to create photographic constellations.

Painting

Ndiritu describes her method of painting as Post-Hippie Pop-Abstraction. It was used as the basis for her SWEATSHOP series of painting installations, which look at the idea of the sweatshop from three juxtaposing yet overlapping angles: Indigenous Tribes who are producing culture and spirituality to feed the New Age movement in the West; The Art Studio - artists who are making objects to feed the art market; Third World Countries - where poorly paid workers make products to feed the luxury, fashion, global consumer market.

Research projects
COVERSLUT is a fashion and economic research project from Ndiritu founded in 2018. It focuses on dealing with issues of democracy, race, gender and class politics. It incorporates capitalist, pay what you can and ethical/environmental strategies into its economic framework. It is inspired by her own writings and thinkers such as Muhammad Yunus (micro loans), Charles Einstein (sacred economics), Vandava Shiva (economic feminism), and Stewart Brand (Whole Earth Catalog). Ndiritu's use of pay what you can in her own art practice has influenced several art institutions including Eastside Projects, Birmingham - Artists Led Multiverse Summit and Kunsthal Ghent's admission fee for their new building and Coventry Biennale, UK in 2019 - to adopt a pay what you can policy inspired by Ndiritu's ideas on institutional critique and structural change.

The Ark: Center For Interdisciplinary Experimentation, took place from 1 to 10 July 2017 in Paris. Part scientific experiment and part spiritual experience, it focused on the role of art, science, spirituality and politics. In order to encourage creativity and vulnerability and to come up with radical, new ways of thinking about life and the problems of today's world, The Ark had no audience for the first six days, so the 15 participants (scientists, artists, gardeners, economists, chef, spiritual workers) could go deeper into this process. The Ark aimed to firstly open a dialogue between its own participants through a multiplicity of themes including Plants, Biology, Shamanism, Meditation, Food, Philosophy, Communities, Education, Architecture, Future of Cities, Democracy and Activism; and secondly with a wider audience during the Public Weekend - performances, film screenings, BBQ party and Academic Roundtable.

Writing
At age fourteen, Ndiritu was published by Oxford University Press. More recently Ndiritu's experimental art writing has been published by Animal Shelter Journal Semiotext(e) MIT Press.

Her political essays "A Call To White America: A Response to Donald J. Trump" (2016), "Notes To a White Left World: Activism in this Current Political Crisis" (2017), "Love in The Time of Trump: The Problematics of Kanye West" (2018) and "The Healing of America" (2020) are published online.

Her first book Dissent Without Modification published by Bergen Kunsthall, Norway (2021) is a critical theory book, made up of research interviews with radical, progressive, forward-thinking women who started their careers in the 1990s. It is a post-hippie, skate, surf, street, neo-tribal book on youth culture.

Media Coverage
In November 2021, Adrian Searle wrote a review for The Guardian praising Our Silver City 2094 and gave it four out of five stars.

In April 2017, Ndiritu was interviewed for The Most Amazing People about death, love, art, grief, and River Phoenix.

In 2014 she was named one of the "ten most important and influential artists under 40" by Apollo magazine in both their European and US issues. 

In September 2014, Apollo magazine included Ndiritu in both their European and US "40 Under 40", an annual issue dedicated to the ten most important and influential artists under forty.

In 2011 Ndiritu's video Desert Storm (2004) was also compared to Titian's The Rape of Europa (1562), Delacroix's painting Death of Sardanapalus (1827), Goya's Disasters of War series of drawings and Gentileschi's painting Susanna and the Elders (1610), by Caroline Bagenal for Afterimage magazine.

Exhibitions

Her archive of films, videos, performances, paintings, textiles, photography and social practice projects have been widely exhibited in solo and group exhibitions, including at The British Art Show 9;  Gropius Bau, Berlin; Musée d'Art Moderne de Paris;  Nottingham Contemporary; MACBA, Barcelona Museum Modern of Art, Warsaw;  Centre Pompidou, Paris; and international film festivals like the 72nd Berlinale, FID Marseilles and BFI London Film Festival. 

Ndiritu's work is also housed in museum collections such as the Los Angeles County Museum of Art, British Council, London, Metropolitan Museum of Art, New York and Modern Art Museum, Warsaw. Her work is also in the private collection of King Mohammed VI, Morocco, as well as The Walther Collection.

References

External links
 

British artists
Kenyan artists
Living people
1982 births